Rom kbach  is a genre of Cambodian popular music and a popular Khmer dance style.  Rom kbach has a slower emotional melody similar to Thai music, whereas the Chamrieng Samai music category of romvong has a faster tune.  The two main cultural dance styles of Cambodia are the romvong and rom kbach, however the lam leav and saravan dance styles are also popular.  They have their roots in ancient cultural traditions.

See also
Khmer classical dance
Dance of Cambodia
Culture of Cambodia
Music of Cambodia

Footnotes

External links
FAR SIDE MUSIC LTD. Modern Khmer Roots

Asian dances
Cambodian culture
Circle dances
Cambodian music